Vision Express is a British company established in 1988 that sells spectacles and contact lenses.

History

The company opened its first store in 1988, at the MetroCentre, Gateshead, quickly followed by several other stores. In October 1993 US Shoe Corp Cincinnati sold the seven of its LensCrafters' superstores in the United Kingdom to Vision Express. In 1995, the first store operating on a joint venture basis was opened.

The company had grown to over 220 stores across the United Kingdom by 2007. In May 2008 Batemans Opticians was acquired, which comprised a seventy-five store chain in Southern England. The majority of these stores have since been rebranded as Vision Express.

There are currently 575 stores throughout the United Kingdom, Jersey and the Republic of Ireland.  Of these stores approx. 195 are fully company-owned, with the remainder being under joint Venture partnerships.

Vision Express is also in Poland, where it has over 110 stores. It has recently opened a series of stores in India in partnership with Reliance.

On 1 May 2013, Vision Express announced that it had acquired twelve optical stores from Crown Eyeglass Ltd. The stores, situated in the North West of England, will become part of the Vision Express portfolio, bringing its total number of outlets in the United Kingdom and Ireland to 331.

Eight of the properties currently trading as Crown Optical Centre and Direkt Optik will transfer optical services to nearby Vision Express premises and Vision Express will seek to retain the valued experience of the Crown Eyeglass Ltd personnel within the Vision Express store network. The remaining four stores will trade from their existing locations, with their existing teams under Vision Express branding.

On 1 February 2014, the high street retail business of Rayner & Keeler Opticians was bought by Vision Express from JBR1910 Limited.

On 1 December 2014 Vision Express announced the acquisition of the business of Liverpool-based Conlons Opticians for an undisclosed fee. It was stated that ten of the nineteen stores purchased would continue to trade from their current locations, with the existing store teams as part of the Vision Express portfolio, with the remaining eight stores transferring services to their nearest Vision Express store.

The following day, it was announced that the store in Millom (which was due to be transferred to the nearby location of Barrow-In-Furness), would remain open following a review from local residents, bringing the total number of Vision Express stores to 390 by the end of 2014.

Following a further announcement on 9 December 2014, Vision Express decided to continue to trade from the Conlons store in Annan as part of its portfolio. This increased the total number of stores to 391 by the end of 2014.

December 2017 saw Vision Express announce the completion of the deal to incorporate 209 Tesco Opticians into their portfolio.  This increased the Vision Express store count (in the UK) to 600. By June 2018, all the Tesco Optician stores had been rebranded to VE@Tesco.

In late March 2020, Vision Express closed non-essential branches indefinitely in a nationwide response to the COVID-19 pandemic. Onur Köksal, (CEO) began to initiate the furlough of all non-essential staff. A small number of clinics are said to have remained open to offer essential, emergency clinical care.

From the end of 2020, to present times, the company began to resume routine testing in line with government guidance. Extra efforts followed to ensure that patients with critical care needs were prioritised over non-essential interactions. Patients were called before attending their appointments to confirm that they had not developed any symptoms of COVID-19 and nor had anyone in their household.

Takeover by Grand Vision
Grand Vision acquired Vision Express in 1997. The French parent company Grand Vision has stores under various brands across Europe, and the rest of the world. Under franchise agreement there is a strong Vision Express brand present also in Latvian and Lithuanian markets. These shops were acquired from GrandVision by Latvian entrepreneurs of "LU Optometrijas Centrs SIA". Currently "Vision Express" brand in Latvia and Lithuania is operated as a part of OC VISION group.

References

External links

 Vision Express website
 Vision Express India
 Vision Express Poland
 Vision Express Lithuania
 Vision Express Latvia
 Vision Express Philippines

Eyewear companies of the United Kingdom
Retail companies of the United Kingdom
British companies established in 1988
Retail companies established in 1988
Eyewear retailers of the United Kingdom
Companies based in Nottinghamshire
1988 establishments in the United Kingdom
Ruddington